The Tibet Museum is a museum dedicated to Tibetan culture in Sogyeok-dong, Jongno-gu, Seoul, South Korea.

See also
List of museums in South Korea

References

External links
   
 Introduction of Tibet Museum at Sungkyunkwan University webzine  

Museums in Seoul
Tibetan culture
Jongno District